Fury of S.H.I.E.L.D. is a comic book miniseries written by Howard Chaykin and drawn by Corky C. Lehmkuhl. Published by Marvel Comics in 1995.

Publication history
The first three issues were marketed with at least one tagline, "The Legendary Agent of S.H.I.E.L.D. in an Explosive New Series!" for the first, "Guest Starring the Invincible Iron Man! and "Kill or Be Killed!" for the second and "Guest Starring the Invincible Iron Man" again as well as "Deadly Allies!" for the third. All of the issues also included the text " Special Contest! Details Inside!" on the covers.

Plot
Fury attempts to reestablish S.H.I.E.L.D. after its destruction.

Reception
Lesley Goldberg of The Hollywood Reporter stated that the series is a great Nick Fury story and that it is helpful to understand the character since it focuses on how he runs S.H.I.E.L.D. Marc Buxton of Den of Geek expressed that despite failing to produce a new ongoing which it was trying to lead into the series still stands out as a highlight of 1990s Marvel.

Prints

See also
 1995 in comics

References

External links
 
 

1995 comics debuts
1995 comics endings
Nick Fury titles
S.H.I.E.L.D. titles
Comics by Howard Chaykin